Emanuel Svensson (born 20 February 1989) is a Swedish footballer who plays for Kristianstads FF on loan from Mjällby AIF as a midfielder.

References

External links

1989 births
Living people
Association football midfielders
Mjällby AIF players
Allsvenskan players
Superettan players
Swedish footballers